Several alkaloids that function as monoamine oxidase inhibitors (MAOIs) are found in the seeds of Peganum harmala (also known as Harmal or Syrian Rue), as well as tobacco leaves including harmine, harmaline, and harmalol, which are members of a group of substances with a similar chemical structure collectively known as harmala alkaloids. These alkaloids are of interest for their use in Amazonian shamanism, where they are derived from other plants. The harmala alkaloid harmine, once known as telepathine and banisterine, is a naturally occurring beta-carboline alkaloid that is structurally related to harmaline, and also found in the vine Banisteriopsis caapi. Tetrahydroharmine is also found in B. caapi and P. harmala. Dr. Alexander Shulgin has suggested that harmine may be a breakdown product of harmaline. Harmine and harmaline are both a reversible inhibitor of monoamine oxidase A (RIMAs). They can stimulate the central nervous system by inhibiting the metabolism of monoamine compounds such as serotonin and norepinephrine.

The harmala alkaloids occur in Peganum harmala in concentrations of roughly 3%, though tests have documented anywhere from 2-7% or even higher, as natural sources tend to vary widely in chemical makeup. Harmala alkaloids are also found in the Banisteriopsis caapi vine, the key plant ingredient in the sacramental beverage ayahuasca, in concentrations that range between 0.31 and 8.43% for harmine, 0.03-0.83% for harmaline and 0.05-2.94% for tetrahydroharmine. Although other psychoactive plants are occasionally added to ayahuasca to achieve visionary states of consciousness, the recipes vary greatly and no single combination is common. Peganum harmala, normally consumed as a tea or used as an incense, is mentioned in classical Persian literature both as a sacred sacrament and as a medicine. The harmala alkaloids are not especially psychedelic, even at higher dosages, when hypnagogic visions, alongside vomiting and diarrhea, become the main effect.

Harmala alkaloids are also found in many other plants, such as Passiflora. The leaves of P. incarnata have been reported variously to give 0.005%, 0.12 mg%, and 0% harmala alkaloids.

Telepathine 
Telepathine was originally thought to be the active chemical constituent of Banisteriopsis caapi, a key plant ingredient in the preparation of ayahuasca; a sacramental beverage from the Amazon. This isolated chemical was so named because of the reported effects of ayahuasca among the indigenous users, including: collective contact with and/or visions of jaguars, snakes, and jeweled birds, and ancestral spirits; the ability to see future events; and as the name suggests, telepathic communication among tribal members. It was assumed to be a newly discovered chemical at the time, however, it was soon realized that telepathine was already more widely known as "harmine" from its previous discovery in Peganum harmala (Syrian Rue).

Uses 

As mentioned above, some harmala alkaloids can be used as a monoamine oxidase inhibitor (MAOI) to facilitate the ingestion of dimethyltryptamine (DMT) and other tryptamines; while not generally used as a hallucinogen alone, there are reports of such use.  In high doses, it acts as purgative. Harmala alkaloids from Banisteriopsis caapi have been used to treat Parkinson's disease. As a benzodiazepine site inverse agonist, harmala alkaloids are used as a model for essential tremor (ET) when injected to animals. Rats being treated with harmaline exhibit severe tremors after 5–7 minutes.  Individuals diagnosed with essential tremor have been found to have elevated blood levels of harmala alkaloids.

Harmala alkaloids interact with smoked cannabis when either smoked/vaporized, or taken orally as an extract or as a tea. Reports are scarce, but generally users experience more intense cannabis-like effects, as well as mild psychedelic effects such as hallucinations, ego dissolution, and increased emotions, especially in large doses. 

Unlike MAOIs such as phenelzine, harmine and harmaline are reversible and selective meaning they do not have nearly as high a risk for "cheese syndrome" caused by consuming tyramine-containing foods, which is a risk associated with monoamine oxidase A inhibitors, but not monoamine oxidase B inhibitors. Both MAO-A and MAO-B break down tyramine, but large doses of harmala alkaloids begin to affect MAO-B as well.

Anticancer 
Isolated harmine was found to exhibit a cytotoxic effect on HL60 and K562 leukemic cell lines. This action might explain the previously observed cytotoxic effect of P. harmala on these cancer cells."

Legal status

Australia
Harmala alkaloids are considered Schedule 9 prohibited substances under the Poisons Standard (October 2015). A Schedule 9 substance is a substance which may be abused or misused, the manufacture, possession, sale or use of which should be prohibited by law except when required for medical or scientific research, or for analytical, teaching or training purposes with approval of Commonwealth and/or State or Territory Health Authorities.

Exceptions are made when in herbs, or preparations, for therapeutic use such as : (a) containing 0.1 per cent or less of harmala alkaloids; or (b) in divided preparations containing 2 mg or less of harmala alkaloids per recommended daily dose.

Chemical forms 

 Harmine: C13H12N2O
 7-Methoxy-1-methyl-9H-pyrido[3,4-b]indole

Harmine is a reversible inhibitor of monoamine oxidase A (RIMA).

 Harmaline: C13H14N2O
 4,9-Dihydro-7-methoxy-1-methyl-3H-pyrido[3,4-b]indole

Harmaline is also a RIMA.

 Harmalol: C12H12N2O
 1-Methyl-4,9-dihydro-3H-pyrido[3,4-b]indol-7-ol

 Tetrahydroharmine: C13H16N2O
 1,2,3,4-tetrahydro-harmine

 Harmalane: C12H10N2
 1-Methyl-3,4-dihydro-beta-carboline. Harmalan occurs in foodstuffs.

 Isoharmine: C13H12N2O

 Harmine acid methyl ester:
 Methyl 7-methoxy-beta-carboline-1-carboxylate

 Harmilinic acid:
 7-Methoxy-3,4-dihydro-beta-carboline-1-carboxylic acid

 Harmanamide:
 1-Carbamoyl-7-methoxy-beta-carboline

 Acetylnorharmine:
 1-Acetyl-7-methoxy-beta-carboline

See also 
 Harmane
 Beta-carboline (norharmane)
 Monoamine oxidase inhibitor
 Reversible inhibitor of monoamine oxidase A (RIMA)

References

External links 
 Tetrahydroharmine entry in TiHKAL • info
 Harmala Alkaloid - an Overview
 

Alkaloids by type of organism
Ayahuasca
Monoamine oxidase inhibitors
Nitrariaceae